Bodie Creek, also called Bodie Inlet, is the estuary of Orqueta Creek and other small streams (such as the Findlay estuary) into Choiseul Sound, located south of the settlement of Goose Green in Lafonia, in the centre of East Falkland, Falkland Islands.

In the estuary, the Bodie Creek Suspension Bridge is considered the southernmost suspension bridge in the world, and connects Lafonia with Goose Green.

References

Landforms of the Falkland Islands
Estuaries of South America